Hiking (walking) boots are footwear specifically designed for protecting the feet and ankles during outdoor walking activities such as hiking. They are one of the most important items of hiking gear, since their quality and durability can determine a hiker's ability to walk long distances without injury. Hiking boots are constructed to provide comfort for walking considerable distance over rough terrain. Boots that protect the hiker's feet and heel are recommended. Hiking boots give ankle support and are fairly stiff. A less popular alternative is to use light trainers with thin soles. Footwear should be neither too loose nor too tight, to help prevent blisters and sore feet. Hiking socks that wick sweat from the feet, provide warmth, and cushion the feet are recommended and a thin, inner sock may also help. Most hiking boots are also designed for other outdoor activities such as backpacking, climbing, mountaineering, and hunting.

Types

There are three main types of walking footwear.
 Trail shoes are made for hiking in dry climates, on well-established, less rugged or rocky paths. They are suitable for many types of day hikes.
 Trail hikers are for steeper inclines and muddy paths. They are used where a lightweight boot is most suitable. Trail hikers are also sturdy, higher-cut, and watertight.  These boots provide more stability and ankle protection against protruding limbs and rocks than hiking shoes do.
 Mountain walking or hiking boots are designed for mountain and hill walking, backpacking and mountaineering. Crampons can be attached to them for a better grip on glaciers or hard-packed snow. They are extremely strong, durable, and have stiff soles to give the ankles support and protection on difficult rocky trails. Mountaineering boots are usually taller and stiffer than hiking boots, providing insulation as well as support and protection.

Parts

 Upper - The upper part of a hiking boot is intended to protect and support the foot with an all-over snug fit. Uppers should be water repellent/proof, but allow the feet to breathe to prevent excess moisture from causing blisters and other discomfort.
 Soles - Hiking boots have deep-lugged soles of tough rubber to provide friction and avoid slip on any surfaces. Soles absorb and redirect shocks, and provides cushion for the feet. 
 Tongues - The flaps that cover the inlet of the upper are called tongues. This is the part the goes underneath the laces. Tongues make sure that water, dirt and debris will not enter the boots.
 Linings and Paddings - Linings and paddings provide more protection and comfort for the feet. 
 Insoles / Foot beds - Insoles are the bottom part of the inner that the feet rest on. Insoles that are perfectly shaped to the hiker's feet will ensure maximum support and balance.
 Shanks - The stiff plastic or metal plates built into the sole. Boots are made with full, three-quarter, or half-length shanks. Longer shanks make for stiffer boots.
 Scree Collars - Protects the Achilles tendon and ankle from chafing.
 Crampon Connections - Crampons are worn on boots to provide traction on snow and ice.

See also

Footwear
Hill walking
Backpacking
Mountaineering boots
Wellington boot
Trail running shoes

References

Boots
Hiking apparel